Middle Stewiacke  is a small community in the Canadian province of Nova Scotia, located  in Colchester County in the Stewiacke Valley.

Navigator

References
Middle Stewiacke on Destination Nova Scotia

Communities in Colchester County
General Service Areas in Nova Scotia